Molly Summerhayes (born 7 June 1997) is an English freestyle skier who participated in the 2018 Winter Olympics. In December 2018, she announced her retirement aged 21, after learning that she would not receive funding.

She is from Sheffield, South Yorkshire and is the younger sister of Olympian skier Katie Summerhayes. The sisters first skied at the former Ski Village in Sheffield when they were aged four and six.

References

1997 births
Living people
English female freestyle skiers
Olympic freestyle skiers of Great Britain
Freestyle skiers at the 2018 Winter Olympics
Sportspeople from Sheffield